Persatuan Sepakbola Ngada, commonly known as PSN Ngada, is an Indonesian football club based in Bajawa, Ngada, East Nusa Tenggara. They currently compete in the Liga 3 and their homeground is Lebijaga Stadium.

Honours
ISC Liga Nusantara
 Runners-up (1): 2016
El Tari Memorial Cup
 Champions (7): 1970, 1982, 1986, 1997, 2001, 2003, 2007

References

External links

Football clubs in Indonesia
Football clubs in East Nusa Tenggara
Association football clubs established in 1968
1968 establishments in Indonesia